Francis Asenso-Boakye (born 24 September 1977) is a Ghanaian politician and businessman. He is a member of the New Patriotic Party. He is the member of parliament for the Bantama Constituency in the Ashanti Region of Ghana. He was the deputy Chief of Staff and Political Assistant to Nana Addo Dankwa Akufo-Addo; President of the Republic of Ghana. He is currently the Minister for Works and Housing.

Early life and education 
He was born on 24 September 1977 and hails from Maase in the Ashanti Region of Ghana. Prior to joining mainstream politics in Ghana, he was a former student activist of the New Patriotic Party who played a pioneering role in the formation of the tertiary students’ wing of the party, the Tertiary Students Confederacy of the New Patriotic Party (TESCON), and served as its Founding President while pursuing his undergraduate studies at the Kwame Nkrumah University of Science and Technology (KNUST). Asenso-Boakye after completing a degree in Kwame Nkrumah University of Science and Technology pursued a master's degree in Public Policy and Administration as a Rotary Scholar at the Michigan State University, Michigan, USA.

Career 
As a development planning, project management, and policy specialist professional, Asenso-Boakye has years of wide-ranging professional experience in these fields.  Prior to joining the staff and campaign of H.E Nana Addo Dankwa Akufo-Addo, he held positions at the Ministry of Employment and Social Welfare (MESW), Global Media Alliance (GMA), Delta Acquisitions and Development, Delaware, USA, Michigan House of Representatives, Michigan, USA, Planning Officer at Ghana Free Zones Board (GFZB), a Project Manager for the Tema Export Processing Zone (TEPZ)and a Research Analyst at the Ghana Investment Promotion Center (GIPC).

As a Project Analyst at Delta Acquisitions and Development, LLC, Delaware, USA, Asenso-Boakye was responsible for monitoring and evaluating the company's real estate acquisitions and development and oversaw the construction of homes/duplexes in Dover, Delaware.

Asenso-Boakye also served as a policy and research associate in the Office of State Representative and to the Michigan Legislative Black Caucus (MLBC) – Michigan House of Representatives, USA, where his work focused on policy and legislative issues affecting the interests of African American and minority communities.
On his return to Ghana, Asenso-Boakye worked for the then NPP Presidential Candidate and current president of the republic of Ghana; Nana Addo Dankwa Akufo-Addo as Political Assistant a position he has held until he was elected into office as a member of parliament.

Political life
In January 2017, Francis Asenso-Boakye was appointed the political assistant and Deputy Chief of Staff at the Flagstaff House by President Nana Addo Dankwa Akufo-Addo. In June 2020, Asenso-Boakye won the Bantama NPP primaries against the incumbent Daniel Okyem Aboagye in a bid to contest for a seat in the Parliament of Ghana. In the 2020 General Elections, he polled 88.84% of total votes cast to emerge as the parliamentary representative of Bantama (Ghana parliament constituency). Consequentially, he has been appointed as the minister-designate for Ministry of Works and Housing (Ghana).

Committees 
Asenso-Boakye is a member of Government Assurance Committee and also a member of Lands and Forestry Committee.

Personal life
Asenso-Boakye is married with three children. He is a Christian.

References

Living people
Kwame Nkrumah University of Science and Technology alumni
Ghanaian MPs 2021–2025
Michigan State University alumni
1977 births